Aram Nerow may refer to:
 Aram Nerow-e Bala
 Aram Nerow-e Pain